State Highway 42 (Andhra Pradesh) is a state highway in the Indian state of Andhra Pradesh.

Route 

It starts at border of Telangana at Aswaraopeta and passes through Jangareddygudem, Koyyalagudem, Tadepalligudem, Pippara and ends at Palakollu.

See also 
 List of State Highways in Andhra Pradesh

References 

State Highways in Andhra Pradesh
Roads in West Godavari district
Roads in Palakollu